The Painter's Woods Historic District, located in Forest Grove, Oregon, is listed on the National Register of Historic Places. Painter's Woods includes the earliest modern subdivision addition to Forest Grove, and represents Forest Grove's transition from a largely agrarian community to a small-urban center of commerce and education. Subsequent construction reflected the ebbs and flows of development in Forest Grove over time. Primarily residential in character, the district includes well-preserved examples of a broad range of architectural styles in currency between 1880 and 1948. It is adjacent to the Clark Historic District.

See also
 National Register of Historic Places listings in Washington County, Oregon

References

National Register of Historic Places in Washington County, Oregon
Buildings and structures in Forest Grove, Oregon
Historic districts on the National Register of Historic Places in Oregon